Hobart Sterling Sacket (February 14, 1844March 11, 1911) was an American farmer and Republican politician.  He served in the Wisconsin State Senate and Assembly, representing Green Lake, Marquette, and Waushara counties.

Biography
Sacket was born on February 14, 1844, in Sackets Harbor, New York. He attended what is now Western Reserve Academy and then relocated to Wisconsin in 1866. He died of heart failure at his home in Berlin.

Career
Sacket was a member of the Wisconsin State Assembly in 1872 before representing the 9th District in the Wisconsin State Senate from 1877 through 1880. Additionally, he was chairman (similar to mayor) of Aurora, Wisconsin, and a delegate to the 1872 Republican National Convention.

References

External links

People from Sackets Harbor, New York
People from Hudson, Ohio
People from Berlin, Wisconsin
Republican Party Wisconsin state senators
Republican Party members of the Wisconsin State Assembly
Mayors of places in Wisconsin
1844 births
1911 deaths